Mary Marr "Polly" Platt (January 29, 1939 – July 27, 2011) was an American film producer, production designer and screenwriter. She was the first female art director accepted into Hollywood's Art Director's Guild. In addition to her credited work, she was known as mentor (for which she was honored with Women in Film Crystal Award) as well as an uncredited collaborator and networker. In the case of the latter, she is credited with contributing to the success of ex-husband and director Peter Bogdanovich's early films; mentoring then, first-time director and writer Cameron Crowe, and discovering actors including Cybill Shepherd, Tatum O'Neal, Owen Wilson, Luke Wilson and director Wes Anderson. Platt also suggested that director James L. Brooks meet artist and illustrator Matt Groening. Their subsequent meeting eventually resulted in the satiric animated television series The Simpsons.

Early life
Platt was born Mary Marr Platt in Fort Sheridan, Illinois, on January 29, 1939, later choosing to be known as 'Polly'. Her father, John, was a colonel in the Judge Advocate General's Corps of the United States Army, while her mother, Vivian, worked in advertising; she had a brother, John. She moved to Germany at the age of six when her father presided over the Dachau Trials. Platt later returned to the US and attended the Carnegie Institute of Technology, now known as Carnegie Mellon University. Phillip Klein, Platt's husband of eight months in 1960, passed away in a car accident.

Career
Platt worked in summer stock theatre as a costume designer in New York and there met Peter Bogdanovich, whom she later married. She co-wrote with him his first movie Targets (1968), conceiving the plot outline of a "Vietnam veteran-turned-sniper", and served as production designer on the film. She repeated the latter role on his film The Last Picture Show (1971), having made the original suggestion to adapt Larry McMurtry's novel and having recommended Cybill Shepherd for her first film role therein. Despite the breakdown of her marriage to Bogdanovich, Platt was again production designer on What's Up, Doc? (1972) and Paper Moon (1973). Bogdanovich commented that: "She worked on important pictures and made major contributions. She was unique. There weren't many women doing that kind of work at that time, particularly not one as well versed as she was. She knew all the departments, on a workmanlike basis, as opposed to most producers who just know things in theory." Platt was the first female member of the Art Directors Guild. She was also production designer on A Star Is Born (1976).

She wrote the screenplay for Pretty Baby (1978), for which she was also an associate producer, as well as Good Luck, Miss Wyckoff (1979), and A Map of the World (1999). She wrote the screenplay for the 1995 Academy Award-winning short film Lieberman in Love, based on a short story by W. P. Kinsella.

Platt worked extensively with James L. Brooks throughout her career. She was the executive vice president of his production company Gracie Films from 1985 to 1995. Platt was nominated for an Academy Award for Best Art Direction for Brooks' film Terms of Endearment (1983). She co-produced many of the films he worked on, which Gracie made, including Broadcast News (1987), The War of the Roses (1989) and Bottle Rocket (1996), as well as producing Say Anything... (1989)  in which she also had a bit part.

Platt gave Brooks the nine-panel Life in Hell cartoon, "The Los Angeles Way of Death" by cartoonist Matt Groening. She suggested that the two meet and that Brooks produce an animated TV version of Groening's characters; the meeting spawned a series of short cartoons about the Simpson family, which aired as part of The Tracey Ullman Show and later became The Simpsons.

In 1994, she was awarded the Women in Film Crystal Award. Brooks said that Platt "couldn't walk into a gas station and get gas without mentoring somebody. Movies are a team sport, and she made teams function. She would assume a maternal role in terms of really being there. The film was everything, and ego just didn't exist." In 2003, she appeared in the BBC documentary film Easy Riders, Raging Bulls. Platt was working on a documentary about the filmmaker Roger Corman at the time of her death. She was very involved with the Austin Film Festival up until her death, and mentored many filmmakers through her participation in the annual festival, which is geared toward screenwriting and production skill-sharing. According to her daughter, Antonia Bogdanovich, "She came every year, religiously, she was a huge supporter," of the Austin Film Festival, and Platt attended the very first festival.

Filmography
(Source IMDB)
{| class="wikitable sortable" 
|-
! Film !! Year !! Producer !!Production Designer !! Costume Designer !! Writer !! Actress !! Miscellaneous Crew !! Art Director !! Stunts !! Thanks !! Self !! Archive Footage 
|-
| The Other Side of the Wind (Posthumous) || 2018 |||| || || || || || style="background: #28e10a; color:#ffffff;"|art director|| || ||||
|-
| The Grand Budapest Hotel|| 2014|| |||| || || || || || || style="background: #28e10a; color:#ffffff;"|special thanks: our old friends|| ||
|-
| The 84th Annual Academy Awards (TV Special) || 2012 |||| || || || || || || || ||||style="background: #28e10a; color:#ffffff;"|Archival Footage
|-
| Corman's World: Exploits of a Hollywood Rebel (Documentary) || 2011 ||style="background: #28e10a; color:#ffffff;"| executive producer|| || || || || || || || ||style="background: #28e10a; color:#ffffff;"|Self ||

|-
| The Girl in the Picture (TV Series) || 2011 || style="background: #28e10a; color:#ffffff;"| executive producer|| || || || || || || || || ||
|-
| The Making of Bottle Rocket (Documentary Short)|| 2008|||| || || || || || || ||  style="background: #28e10a; color:#ffffff;"|special thanks|| style="background: #28e10a; color:#ffffff;"| Self|| 
|-
| Bean (short)|| 2008|| |||| || || || || || || style="background: #28e10a; color:#ffffff;"|thanks|| ||
|-
| A West Texas Children's Story || 2007|| style="background: #28e10a; color:#ffffff;"| executive producer|| || || || || || || || || ||

|-
| Muertas (Short) || 2007 || style="background: #28e10a; color:#ffffff;"| |executive producer|| || || || || || || |||| || 
|-
| Asking for the Moon (Video Documentary Short) || 2003 |||| || || || || style="background: #28e10a; color:#ffffff;"| self: interviewed|| |||| ||style="background: #28e10a; color:#ffffff;"| self||
|-
| The Next Picture Show (Video Short) || 2003 |||| || || || || style="background: #28e10a; color:#ffffff;"| self: interviewed|| |||| ||style="background: #28e10a; color:#ffffff;"| self||
|-
|Women on Top: Hollywood and Power (TV Movie Documentary) || 2003 |||| || || || || style="background: #28e10a; color:#ffffff;"| self: interviewed|| |||| ||style="background: #28e10a; color:#ffffff;"| self||
|-
| A Decade Under the Influence (Documentary) || 2003 |||| || || || || style="background: #28e10a; color:#ffffff;"| self: interviewed|| |||| ||style="background: #28e10a; color:#ffffff;"| self||
|-
| Easy Riders, Raging Bulls: How the Sex, Drugs and Rock 'N' Roll Generation Saved Hollywood (Documentary) || 2003 |||| || || || || style="background: #28e10a; color:#ffffff;"| self: interviewed|| |||| ||style="background: #28e10a; color:#ffffff;"| self||

|-
| Headliners & Legends with Matt Lauer (TV Series documentary): Brook Shields|| 2001 |||| || || || || style="background: #28e10a; color:#ffffff;"| self: interviewed|| |||| ||style="background: #28e10a; color:#ffffff;"| self||
|-
| E! True Hollywood Story: The O'Neals (TV Series documentary)|| 2001 |||| || || || || style="background: #28e10a; color:#ffffff;"| self: interviewed|| |||| ||style="background: #28e10a; color:#ffffff;"| self: interviewed ||
|-
|Without Lying Down: Frances Marion and the Power of Women in Hollywood (TV Movie documentary) || 2000|| |||| || || || || || || ||style="background: #28e10a; color:#ffffff;"|self ||
|-
|Sugar Town||1999|| || || |||| style="background: #28e10a; color:#ffffff;"|Maggie|| || || || || || 
|-
|A Map of the World ||1999|| || || ||style="background: #28e10a; color:#ffffff;"| writer: screenplay|| ||  || || || || || 
|-
| Dogtown|| 1997|| |||| || || || || || || style="background: #28e10a; color:#ffffff;"|the production wishes to thank|| ||
|-
|Getting the Goods on 'As Good As It Gets''' (TV Movie documentary) || 1997|| |||| || || || || || || ||style="background: #28e10a; color:#ffffff;"|self ||
|-
| The Evening Star || 1996|| style="background: #28e10a; color:#ffffff;"| producer|| || || || || || || || || ||

|-
| Bottle Rocket || 1996|| style="background: #28e10a; color:#ffffff;"| producer|| || || || || || || || || ||
|-
|Ben Johnson: Third Cowboy on the Right (Documentary) || 1996|| |||| || || || || || || ||style="background: #28e10a; color:#ffffff;"|self ||

|-
| I'll Do Anything || 1994|| style="background: #28e10a; color:#ffffff;"| producer|| || || || || || || || || ||
|-
|Picture This: The Times of Peter Bogdanovich in Archer City, Texas (Documentary) || 1991|| |||| || || || || || || ||style="background: #28e10a; color:#ffffff;"|self ||
|-
|Texasville|| 1990|| |||| || || || || || || style="background: #28e10a; color:#ffffff;"|special thanks|| ||
|-
| Let's Get Mom (TV Movie) || 1989|| style="background: #28e10a; color:#ffffff;"| producer|| || || || || || || || || ||
|-
| The War of the Roses||1989|| style="background: #28e10a; color:#ffffff;"| executive producer|| || || || || || || || || ||
|-
| Say Anything... || 1989|| style="background: #28e10a; color:#ffffff;"| producer|| || || || style="background: #28e10a; color:#ffffff;"| Mrs Flood|| || || || || || 
|-
|Big|| 1988|| |||| || || || || || || style="background: #28e10a; color:#ffffff;"|special thanks|| ||
|-
| Broadcast News ||1987|| style="background: #28e10a; color:#ffffff;"| executive producer|| || || || || || || || || ||
|-
| The Witches of Eastwick || 1987 || || style="background: #28e10a; color:#ffffff;"| production designer|| || || || || || || || ||
|-
| Between Two Women (TV Movie) ||1986|| style="background: #28e10a; color:#ffffff;"| co-producer|| style="background: #28e10a; color:#ffffff;"| production designer || || || || || || || || ||
|-
| Terms of Endearment||1983|| || style="background: #28e10a; color:#ffffff;"| production designer || || || || || || || || ||
|-
| The Man with Two Brains||1983|| || style="background: #28e10a; color:#ffffff;"| production designer || || || || || || || || || 
|-
| Young Doctors in Love ||1982|| || style="background: #28e10a; color:#ffffff;"| production designer || || || || || || || || || ||
|-
|Good Luck, Miss Wyckoff ||1979|| || || ||style="background: #28e10a; color:#ffffff;"| writer: screenplay|| || || || || || 
|-
|Lieberman in Love (short) ||1979|| || || ||style="background: #28e10a; color:#ffffff;"| writer: teleplay|| || || || || || || 
|-
| Pretty Baby ||1978|| style="background: #28e10a; color:#ffffff;"| associate producer|| || ||style="background: #28e10a; color:#ffffff;"| writer: screenplay/story|| || || || || || ||
|-
| A Star Is Born|| 1976|| ||  style="background: #28e10a; color:#ffffff;"| production designer|| || || || || || || || ||
|-
| The Bad News Bears|| 1976|| || style="background: #28e10a; color:#ffffff;"| production designer|| || || || || || || || ||
|-
|Thieves Like Us|| 1974|| || || style="background: #28e10a; color:#ffffff;"| costume designer (uncredited)|| || || || || || || ||
|-
|Paper Moon|| 1973|| || style="background: #28e10a; color:#ffffff;"| production designer|| style="background: #28e10a; color:#ffffff;"| costume designer (uncredited)|| || || || || || || ||
|-
| The Thief Who Came to Dinner|| 1973|| || style="background: #28e10a; color:#ffffff;"| production designer|| style="background: #28e10a; color:#ffffff;"| costume designer (uncredited)|| || || || || || || ||
|-
| What's Up, Doc?|| 1972|| || style="background: #28e10a; color:#ffffff;"| production designer|| style="background: #28e10a; color:#ffffff;"| costume designer (uncredited)|| || || || || || || ||
|-
| The Last Picture Show|| 1972|| || style="background: #28e10a; color:#ffffff;"| design|| style="background: #28e10a; color:#ffffff;"| costume designer (uncredited)|| || || || || || || ||
|-
| Target: Harry|| 1969|| || || style="background: #28e10a; color:#ffffff;"| costume designer (uncredited)|| || || || || || || ||
|-
| Targets|| 1968|| || style="background: #28e10a; color:#ffffff;"| production designer|| style="background: #28e10a; color:#ffffff;"| costume designer (uncredited)|| style="background: #28e10a; color:#ffffff;"| writer: story|| || || || || || ||
|-
| Voyage to the Planet of Prehistoric Women|| 1968|| || || || || || style="background: #28e10a; color:#ffffff;"| production coordinator|| || ||  || ||
|-
| The Wild Angels|| 1966|| |||| style="background: #28e10a; color:#ffffff;"| costume designer (uncredited)|| || || || || style="background: #28e10a; color:#ffffff;"| stunt double: Nancy Sinatra (uncredited)|| || ||
|}

Personal life
Platt was married to Philip Klein until his death in a car accident in 1959, eight months after they married, and to director Peter Bogdanovich from 1962 to 1971. They divorced after Bogdanovich left her during the filming of The Last Picture Show for its lead actress Cybill Shepherd. Platt and Bogdanovich had two children: Antonia and Sashy. Platt later married prop maker Tony Wade; they remained married until his death in 1985. She was stepmother to his two children, Kelly and Jon.

The 1984 film Irreconcilable Differences, starring Ryan O'Neal, Shelley Long and Drew Barrymore, was reportedly loosely based on her marriage to Bogdanovich, and their divorce, and Platt herself confirmed the film "got more right than wrong."

Platt's talent as a mentor and film producer was deeply admired by her peers, who felt she should have become a director. She struggled with alcoholism for more than 25 years. Additionally, sexism in the film industry made directing unlikely for her.

Platt participated in a 2000 Texasville reunion of some of the cast and crew of The Last Picture Show. She and Cybill Shepherd had made peace and were on friendly terms. Platt and her children were reconciled with Bogdanovich when she died.

Death
Platt died in Manhattan, on July 27, 2011, from amyotrophic lateral sclerosis, aged 72. She was survived by her brother John "Jack" Platt, her two daughters Antonia Bogdanovich and Sashy Bogdanovich, her son-in-law Pax Wassermann, and three grandchildren.

Legacy
Platt was the first female film art director to be accepted into the Art Director's Guild, a membership she required in order to receive credit on studio films. In May 2020, film journalist and podcast producer/writer/host Karina Longworth began the sixth season of the podcast You Must Remember This with a focus on the significance of Polly Platt's work within the larger context of late 20th-century U.S. film history. The season, "Polly Platt, The Invisible Woman", includes interviews with family, friends, and colleagues (as well as readings from Platt's unpublished memoir) documenting her (often uncredited) contributions to commercially and critically successful films of the late 1960s and into the early 2000s. Longworth argues that Platt played a pivotal role in the location, casting, and overall visual aesthetic of major films, including but not limited to Paper Moon, What's Up, Doc? and The Last Picture Show. Actress Maggie Siff voices Platt in the podcast.

References

Further reading
This list is taken from the season source list at the podcast You Must Remember This, which includes more material, including interviews, archival sources, and excerpts from Platt's unpublished memoir It Was Worth It.

Books
Abramowitz, Rachel. Is That a Gun in Your Pocket?: Women's Experience of Power in Hollywood. Random House, 2000
Biskind, Peter. Easy Riders, Raging Bulls. Simon & Schuster, 1998
Burstyn, Ellen. Lessons in Becoming Myself. Riverhead Books, 2007
Fink, Moritz. The Simpsons: A Cultural History (Series: The Cultural History of Television). Rowman & Littlefield, 2019
Galloway, Stephen. Leading Lady: Sherry Lansing and the Making of a Hollywood Groundbreaker. Crown Archetype, 2017
Harris, Mark. Pictures at a Revolution: Five Movies and the Birth of the New Hollywood. Penguin Books (reprint edition), 2009
Jaglom, Henry. My Lunches with Orson: Conversations Between Henry Jaglom and Orson Welles. Picador, 2014
McMurtry, Larry. Hollywood: A Third Memoir. Simon & Schuster, 2010
O'Neal, Tatum. A Paper Life. William Marrow Paperbacks (reprint edition), 2005
Ortved, John. The Simpsons: An Uncensored, Unauthorized History. Farrar, Straus and Giroux, 2009
Shepherd, Cybill, and Ball, Aimee Lee. Cybill Disobedience. River Siren Productions, Inc., 2009
Yule, Andrew. Picture Shows: The Life and Films of Peter Bogdanovich. Limelight, 2004
Zierold, Norman J. The Moguls. Coward-McCann, 1969

Articles
"Critic-Into-Film-maker in the French Style" by Kevin Thomas, Los Angeles Times, June 4, 1967
"‘Target’ For Exploitation: Refreshing, Promising 1st" by John Mahoney, The Hollywood Reporter, May 6, 1968
"Par Buys ‘Targets’, Bogdanovich Indie", The Hollywood Reporter, July 26, 1968
"Par Gropes on Sniper Pic" by Lee Beaupre, Variety, August 7, 1968
"One Does Not Want This Sniper To Miss" by Renata Adler, The New York Times, August 25, 1968
"Bogdanovich Debuts as a Director with Targets" by Kevin Thomas, Los Angeles Times, September 6, 1968
"Polly's progress" by Jean Cox, Women’s Wear Daily, December 20, 1976
"Pretty Baby" by Joan Goodman, New York Magazine, September 26, 1977
"Now Polly Platt Has a Script of Her Own" by John M. Wilson, Los Angeles Times, January 15, 1978
"Adler’s ‘Roses’ Set For Fox Film; Author Now To Adapt ‘Random,’", Variety, September 11, 1985
"Will ‘Anything’ Go Over?" by Jeffrey Wells, August 8, 1993 
"She's Done Everything Except Direct" by Rachel Abramovitz, Premiere, November 1993
"Carsey-Werner signs up Platt" by Donna Parker, The Hollywood Reporter, February 13, 1995
"Platt pens McMurtry Pic, Hopes to Helm", Variety, February 26, 1996
"On Its Own Terms" by Joe Leydon, Los Angeles Times, April 7, 1996
"When Hollywood Was Really a Man's World", Los Angeles Times, July 19, 1998
"Flashback for ‘60s filmmakers" by Lynette Rice, The Hollywood Reporter, March 8, 1999
"Moving ‘Targets’", Variety, April 21, 2004
"Films Will be Dimmer Without Her" by Patrick Goldstein, Los Angeles Times, July 30, 2011
"Polly Platt, Film Producer and Designer, Dies at 72" by Margalit Fox, The New York Times, July 31, 2011
"Obituaries: Polly Platt" by Ryan Gilbey, The Guardian, August 8, 2011
"Remembering Polly Platt", The Hollywood Reporter, August 12, 2011
Vol. 15, No. 2 (Fall 2015), published by University of Minnesota Press "How to Succeed: Fail, Lose, Die - Women in Hollywood" by Maureen Orth
"Women Directors in Hollywood" by Jan Haag
"Breaking Away from Reverence and Rape: The AFI Directing Workshop for Women, Feminism, and the Politics of the Accidental Archive"
"The Moving Image: The Journal of the Association of Moving Image Archivists", Philis M. Barragán Goetz

External links
 
 Hudson, David. "Credit Where Credit's Due: Polly Platt". The Daily: on Film. The Criterion Collection, 26 May 2020
 Hyland, Veronique. "Polly Platt Was Hollywood's 'Invisible Woman.': Karina Longworth Wants You to Know Her Name". Elle, 26 May 2020
 THR Staff. "Remembering Polly Platt". The Hollywood Reporter'', 2 August 2011

1939 births
2011 deaths
Film producers from Illinois
American production designers
American women film producers
People from Fort Sheridan, Illinois
Deaths from motor neuron disease
Neurological disease deaths in New York (state)
American women screenwriters
Screenwriters from Illinois
Women production designers
21st-century American women